Yannis Dounias (Γιάννης Ντουνιάς, born 1943 in Athens) is a Greek Laïko singer. He released over a dozen of full-length albums, on labels ranging from Polydor Records and Philips Records to independent ones.

 
 

He is married to his wife since 1969 and has three children, two sons and a daughter.

References

External links

Living people
1943 births
20th-century Greek male singers
Musicians from Athens